Beongo Airport  was an airport serving Beongo, Democratic Republic of the Congo. It was built in the 1980s for logging operations in the area. As of April 2019, the former runway is completely overgrown with trees and barely visible.

References

Airports in Tshuapa Province